Else is a feminine given name, appearing in German, Danish and Norwegian. It is a shortened form of Elisabeth.

Notable people with the name include:

 Else Alfelt (1910–1974), Danish painter
 Else Ackermann, German physician and pharmacologist
 Else Winther Andersen (born 1941), Danish politician
 Else Berg (1877–1942), Dutch painter
 Else Bugge Fougner (born 1944), Norwegian lawyer and politician
 Else Christensen (1913–2005), Danish neopagan
 Else Feldmann (1884–1942), Austrian writer
 Else Frenkel-Brunswik (1908–1958), Polish-Austrian psychologist
 Else Hench (20th century), Austrian luger
 Else Hirsch (1889–1942/3), German-Jewish teacher
 Else Holmelund Minarik (1920–2012), Danish American author
 Else Jacobsen (1911–1965), Danish swimmer
 Else Krüger (1915–2005), German secretary
 Else Lasker-Schüler (1869–1945), Jewish German poet and playwright
 Else Mayer (1891–1962), German nun
 Else Meidner (1901–1987), Jewish German painter
 Else Repål (1930–2015), Norwegian politician
 Else Reppen (1933–2006), Norwegian philanthropist
 Else Sehrig-Vehling (1897–1994), German expressionist
 Else Seifert (1879–1968), German photographer
 Else Ury (1877–1943), German writer
 Else von Richthofen (1874–1973), German social scientist

See also
Else-Marie
Else-Marthe Sørlie Lybekk (born 1978), Norwegian handball player

Danish feminine given names
Feminine given names